Austropotamobius pallipes is an endangered European freshwater crayfish, and the only crayfish native to the British Isles. Its common names include white-clawed crayfish and Atlantic stream crayfish.

Distribution
It is found from the easterly Balkan Peninsula to Spain and reaches its northerly limit in Great Britain, as well as Ireland (where it is considered introduced), where it is limited to some regions only: its highest densities are in chalk streams. A. pallipes is the only crayfish found in Ireland, occurring over limestone areas in rivers, streams, canals, and lakes. In France, A. pallipes is found in streams such as the Mornante and Sellon, two small tributaries of the Dorlay in the Loire department. It is protected as a heritage species. It has also been introduced to Corsica, Liechtenstein, and Portugal (from where it is now extirpated).

It was once found across most of Great Britain; however its distribution is rapidly shrinking, and it is recorded in Yorkshire, central and northern England, east Kent, eastern Wales, the Candover Brook that flows into the Itchen in Hampshire; parts of Essex, and several long headwaters of the River Thames, where it competes with the introduced noble crayfish, itself also facing competition from the introduced signal crayfish. Dowdeswell Reservoir, Gloucestershire, has the species and during works of 1998, Severn Trent ensured its protection. Disease from invasive species has wiped it from the naturally alkaline River Frome, Bristol, 2007–08.

Ecology
It is absent from more acidic waters and occurs in streams with a moderate flow alongside other freshwater invertebrates such as caddis fly, mayfly, and mollusc species. Trout and three-spined stickleback also occur in the same habitat. Tree roots and rocks in the banks provide shelter. Juveniles shelter in vegetation such as watercress and grass mats growing out of the bank.

Description
A. pallipes is olive-brown, with pale undersides to the claws (whence its specific Latin epithet pallipes, "pale feet"). It typically lives in rivers and streams about 1 m (3 ft) deep, where it hides among rocks and submerged logs, emerging to forage for food, and in lakes.

Conservation
Two main reasons for decline are:
Introduction of the invasive North American signal crayfish (Pacifastacus leniusculus) and red swamp crayfish (Procambarus clarkii): The former is a carrier of crayfish plague, an infectious disease to which it has resistance, while A. pallipes has none. 
Water pollution: Many local extinctions are caused by surface runoff of insecticides and of bleached, insufficiently treated, or illegal untreated wastewater.

Further reading
Sweeney, N. and Sweeney, P. 2017. Expansion of the White-clawed Crayfish (Austropotamobius pallipes (Lereboullet)) population in Munster Blackwater. Irish Naturalists' Journal. 35(2) pp. 94–98.

References

External links

Astacidae
Freshwater crustaceans of Europe
Crustaceans described in 1858